David Prouty High School is a public high school located in Spencer, Massachusetts, United States. In the 2015 rankings of U.S. News & World Report Best High Schools, David Prouty High School was left unranked. The school serves grades 9–12 with a student to teacher ratio of 13:1.

Demographics 
The David Prouty High School is made up of 149 boys and 144 girls.

82.6% of the students at David Prouty High School are white. 9.2% of the students are Hispanic. 4.1% are multi race. 1.7% are African American. 1.7% are Asian. 0.7% are Native American.

33.4% of the students are economically challenged.

The freshman class has 71 students. The sophomore class has 69 students. The junior class has 92 students. The senior class has 58 students.

AP Testing 
Out of all of the students in the high school 23% of them took the AP test. Out of those students 41% of them passed.

Athletics
David Prouty High School is part of the South Worcester County League and offers various sports programs throughout the school year. The fall sports season includes Golf, Soccer, Cheerleading, Cross Country, Football, and Field Hockey. Winter brings Cheerleading, Boys and Girls Basketball and Indoor Track. Spring sports offerings are Baseball, Softball, Tennis and Outdoor Track.

Student sit-in protest – 2015
On November 18, 2015, more than 200 students from David Prouty High School took part in a sit-in in protest of the district's administration. Protesting the lack of current textbooks, cuts in the music and theater programs, the band, and the Student Council, they walked out of class and spent the day in the gymnasium. Having not been satisfied with having their voices heard at the School Committee meeting the night before, they were targeting the superintendent, Tracey Crowe, whom the district's teachers had also given a vote of no confidence in.

Notable alumni
Patrick Ricard, American football player
Leah Van Dale fitness model and professional wrestler whose ring name is Carmella.
Don Brown, American football coach: University of Massachusetts, Amherst Head Coach for their NCAA Division I Football program.

See also 
 List of high schools in Massachusetts

References

Schools in Worcester County, Massachusetts
Public high schools in Massachusetts